Poggio Capanne is a village in Tuscany, central Italy, administratively a frazione of the comune of Manciano, province of Grosseto. At the time of the 2001 census its population amounted to 101.

Geography 
Poggio Capanne is about 60 km from Grosseto and 18 km from Manciano, and it is situated along the Provincial Road which links Montemerano to Sovana, at the top of a small hill ("poggio") in the valley of Albegna.

History 
The village, formerly known as Capanne di Saturnia and then just as Capanne, was born in the 15th century as a rural hamlet of shepherds and farmers dependent on the town of Saturnia.

Main sights 
 Church of Visitazione di Maria (16th century), main parish church of the village, it was built in 1570.
 Casa Luciani, one of the oldest buildings in the village, it was built in 1500, as indicated on the facade. It hosted also the canonica.
 Old prison of Saturnia (16th century), it is situated next to the church in the main square of the village.

References

Bibliography 
  Emanuele Repetti, «Poggio Capanne», Dizionario Geografico Fisico Storico della Toscana, 1833–1846.
 Bruno Santi, Guida storico-artistica alla Maremma. Itinerari culturali nella provincia di Grosseto, Siena, Nuova Immagine, 1995, p. 291.
 Giovanni De Feo, Le città del tufo nella valle del Fiora. Guida ai centri etruschi e medioevali della Maremma collinare, Pitigliano, Laurum Editrice, 2005.

See also 
 Marsiliana
 Montemerano
 Poderi di Montemerano
 Poggio Murella
 San Martino sul Fiora
 Saturnia

Frazioni of Manciano